The trigeminal motor nucleus contains motor neurons that innervate muscles of the first branchial arch, namely the muscles of mastication, the tensor tympani, tensor veli palatini, mylohyoid, and anterior belly of the digastric. This nucleus is located in the mid-pons (i.e. in the center of the pons going inferior to superior).

Lesion
The trigeminal motor nucleus forms the efferent pathway of the jaw jerk reflex. Since the axons involved in this reflex do not decussate, a lesion involving the trigeminal motor nucleus would cause ipsilateral hemiparesis.

References

External links
 Washington University

Cranial nerve nuclei
Trigeminal nerve
Pons